"Mama Said" is a single by Danish recording act Lukas Graham. The song was released as a digital download on 23 June 2014 through Copenhagen Records. It achieved success in Denmark, Norway, Finland and Sweden. The song was written by Lukas Forchhammer, Morten Ristorp, Stefan Forrest, and Morten "Pilo" Pilegaard, and it was produced by Forrest and Ristorp under their stage name Future Animals, and Pilegaard. It samples the song "It's the Hard Knock Life" from the musical Annie.

Track listing

Charts

Weekly charts

Year-end charts

Certifications

Release history

References

External links
 

2014 songs
2014 singles
2010s ballads
Lukas Graham songs
Pop ballads
Number-one singles in Denmark
Songs written by Lukas Forchhammer
Songs written by Stefan Forrest
Songs written by Morten Ristorp
Copenhagen Records singles
Warner Records singles